is a Japanese footballer currently playing as a forward for Fukushima United.

Career statistics

Club
.

Notes

References

External links

1996 births
Living people
People from Sōka
Sportspeople from Saitama Prefecture
Association football people from Saitama Prefecture
Rissho University alumni
Japanese footballers
Association football forwards
J3 League players
Fukushima United FC players
21st-century Japanese people